A. Subramaniam was an Indian freedom fighter and politician belonging to Praja Socialist Party. He took part in Quit India Movement. For taking part in this movement he was sent to jail. He was elected as a member of the Tamil Nadu Legislative Assembly from Singanallur in 1971. He died on 20 March 2019 at the age of 93.

References

2019 deaths
Praja Socialist Party politicians
Members of the Tamil Nadu Legislative Assembly
1920s births